is a Japanese composer and sound producer. He is best known for scoring the video games Final Fantasy Tactics and Final Fantasy XII, though he has composed soundtracks for over 80 other games. He began playing music and video games in elementary school, and began composing video game music for money by the time he was 16. Sakimoto's professional career began a few years later in 1988 when he started composing music professionally as a freelancer, as well as programming sound drivers for games. 

In 1997, he joined Square and composed for his first international success, the score to Final Fantasy Tactics. In 2002, he resigned from Square to form his own music production company, Basiscape, through which he continues to compose music for games as well as anime. His music has been played at concerts and published as sheet music.

Biography

Early life
Sakimoto was born on February 26, 1969, in Tokyo, Japan. He began developing an interest in music beginning in elementary school, when he taught himself to play the piano and electronic organ and participated in some brass and rock bands. A fan of video games, he began creating his own games in junior high school with some friends. While in his senior high school years, Sakimoto wrote for the computer magazine Oh!FM and compiled data about pieces of music he liked, becoming a self-professed "computer, games, and music geek".

Sakimoto started composing for games when he was 16, and was paid to both create the music and the program to play it for several games. Composing for these games was the first time he had ever composed music for any instrument. His debut as a professional gaming composer came in 1988, when he and his friend Masaharu Iwata, whom he has worked with on numerous later titles, scored the shooter game Revolter, published by ASCGroup for the NEC PC-8801. Sakimoto also created the synthesizer driver "Terpsichorean" to enhance the sound quality of the game's music; the synthesizer driver has been implemented into many games throughout the Japanese game market in the early 1990s. Despite Revolters success, he continued with his previous goal to become a video game programmer rather than a composer; however, his friends and colleagues encouraged him to continue composing game music. The recognition he gained within the gaming industry jump-started his career.

Career
After Revolter, Sakimoto's music and synthesizer driver earned him immediate recognition in the industry, resulting in him being asked to score several PC-9801 and Mega Drive games such as Starship Rendezvous and Gauntlet IV, as well as use his driver both in the scores he wrote and for other games. Between 1990 and 1992, Sakimoto worked on over 20 different video games for several different companies such as Toshiba EMI, Artec, and Data East. It was during this time that he composed his first solo score in 1990 for Bubble Ghost.

Sakimoto's first encounter with mainstream success in Japan came about in 1993 when he composed Ogre Battle: March of the Black Queen. The game was directed by Yasumi Matsuno, and since the release of the title, he has chosen Sakimoto as a regular for his development team at Quest and later Square. Sakimoto also worked on 14 other titles that year, including Shin Megami Tensei and Alien vs. Predator. Over the next few years, he would go on to compose for or work on over 40 more titles such as Tactics Ogre and Dragon Quest VI. In 1997, Sakimoto joined Square and composed the score for Final Fantasy Tactics, which made him internationally famous, and was the score he was best known for outside Japan until at least 2006. Although he worked on a handful of titles by other companies over the next few years, his next work for Square did not come until 2000, with the successful Vagrant Story. It was his last score as an employee of Square; although he went on to first compose Breath of Fire V and Tactics Ogre: The Knight of Lodis for Capcom and Quest, after a couple of years of planning he resigned from Square to form his own music production company, Basiscape, in October 2002.

Basiscape
Basiscape composes and produces music and sound effects for various types of interactive media, most notably video games. Sakimoto says that he left Square to found the company because he did not feel that he had enough "freedom" as an employee of a game company, though he notes that the cost of that freedom is the difficulty in remaining close to the development team. At its founding, it comprised only three members: Sakimoto, Iwata, and Manabu Namiki. Through Basiscape, Sakimoto continued to compose for several different companies, including Square—now Square Enix—with Final Fantasy Tactics Advance. The company expanded in 2005 with the addition of composers Mitsuhiro Kaneda and Kimihiro Abe. After the huge success of 2006's Final Fantasy XII, which he scored, demand for Sakimoto's compositions grew stronger with gaming companies and he decided to expand Basiscape again by hiring Noriyuki Kamikura, Yoshimi Kudo, and Azusa Chiba. It is currently the largest independent video game music production company, and continues to work on large titles such as Odin Sphere and Final Fantasy XII: Revenant Wings. The composers for the company are able to procure individual work for themselves as members of Basiscape, as well as collaborate with other staff members on projects that are hired out to Basiscape as a company rather than any one composer, which allows the composers to remain freelancers while having the steady work of a full-time job. The company also handles sound effects and narration in addition to soundtracks for the projects that it works on, and at the end of 2009 expanded to start its own record label.

Sakimoto has also been involved in non-gaming projects during his career. He contributed one track each to the albums Ten Plants (1998) and 2197 (1999), which feature music from various well-known artists. Sakimoto collaborated with singer Lia in 2005 to create the music for the album Colors of Life. He composed the music for two anime series; Romeo x Juliet (2007) and The Tower of Druaga: The Aegis of Uruk (2008); as well as the original video animation (OVA) Legend of Phoenix ~Layla Hamilton Monogatari~ in 2005.

Performances

Sakimoto has made numerous appearances at video game concerts that have performed his compositions. He, along with Yoko Shimomura and Michael Salvatori, were special guests at a July 2006 Play! A Video Game Symphony event at the Orchestra Hall in Detroit. He has developed a strong relationship with the Australian-based Eminence Symphony Orchestra. Sakimoto and Yasunori Mitsuda made guest appearances at their Passion event in December 2006. In April 2007, he appeared at Eminence's A Night in Fantasia 2007: Symphonic Games Edition, which featured three of his compositions. Sakimoto and Mitsuda collaborated with Eminence in July the same year to create Destiny: Reunion, a concert held exclusively in Japan. Eminence released Passion (2006) and Destiny: Dreamer's Alliance (2007), two studio recorded albums that feature various compositions from the Passion and Destiny: Reunion concerts respectively. "Penelo's Theme" from Final Fantasy XII and a medley of pieces from Final Fantasy Tactics A2 were played at the Fantasy Comes Alive concert in Singapore in April 2010.

Musical style and influences
Sakimoto composes his music by playing the pieces "briefly on the piano", and then working on a computer for more detailed arrangements. The style of Sakimoto's compositions is mostly orchestral; he creates the orchestral sound by playing the music through a sequencer instead of using a real orchestra due to the high cost. When composing a soundtrack for a video game, Sakimoto first sits down with the director or producer of the game and works out what emotions they want the game to evoke in the player, and after making a demo for them, sets out to create music that fits that feeling. He claims that his style of composition does not change when he works on non-game works such as anime series, saying that only the tone of the pieces is different. He attributes any changes in his style over the years to his desire to constantly keep growing and learning new styles and techniques, saying that if you have not moved forward in your skill and style over time, "you've wasted your time".

He has stated that his biggest musical influences are "old techno and progressive rock" groups such as the Japanese synthpop group Yellow Magic Orchestra. When he was starting out in the field of music, he went under the pseudonym "YmoH.S", a reference to Yellow Magic Orchestra. He also cites the American jazz musician Chick Corea as a major influence. While creating the music for Final Fantasy XII, however, his biggest musical inspiration was former regular series composer Nobuo Uematsu. Sakimoto enjoys listening to techno and jazz fusion in his spare time. While he sometimes gets inspiration while relaxing at home, Sakimoto feels that his best ideas come to him while he is at his studio concentrating. One of his favorite soundtracks he composed was the one for Vagrant Story.

Works

Video games

Revolter (1988) – with Masaharu Iwata
Bubble Ghost (1990)
Carat (1990) – with Masaharu Iwata and Yoshio Furukawa
Starship Rendezvous (1990) – with Masaharu Iwata
Devilish (1991)
Verytex (1991) – with Masaharu Iwata and Yoshio Furukawa
King Breeder (1991) – with Masaharu Iwata
Magical Chase (1991) – with Masaharu Iwata
Cyber Block Metal Orange (1991) – with Masaharu Iwata and Yoshio Furukawa
Midnight Resistance (1991) – (the Sega Sega Genesis port) 
Bad Omen (1992)
Gauntlet IV (1993) – with Masaharu Iwata
Super Back to the Future II (1993)
Ogre Battle: The March of the Black Queen (1993) – with Masaharu Iwata and Hayato Matsuo
X-Kaliber 2097 (1994) – with Hayato Matsuo
Kingdom Grand Prix (1994) – with Masaharu Iwata
Moldorian: Hikari to Yami no Sister (1994)
Tactics Ogre: Let Us Cling Together (1995) – with Masaharu Iwata and Hayato Matsuo
Chick's Tale (1995)
Dragon Master Silk II (1995)
Treasure Hunter G (1996) – with several others
Terra Diver (1996)
Hourai Gakuen no Bouken! (1996)
Chip-chan Kick! (1996) – with Masaharu Iwata and Yoshio Furukawa
Bloody Roar (1997) – with Atsuhiro Motoyama, Kenichi Koyano, Manabu Namiki, and Masaharu Iwata
Final Fantasy Tactics (1997) – with Masaharu Iwata
Radiant Silvergun (1998)
Armed Police Batrider (1998) – with Kenichi Koyano and Manabu Namiki
Ogre Battle 64: Person of Lordly Caliber (1999) – with Masaharu Iwata and Hayato Matsuo
Vagrant Story (2000)
Tactics Ogre: The Knight of Lodis (2001) – with Masaharu Iwata
Kuusen (2001)
Legaia 2: Duel Saga (2001) – with Yasunori Mitsuda and Michiru Oshima
Tekken Advance (2001) – with Atsuhiro Motoyama
Breath of Fire: Dragon Quarter (2002)
Perfect Prince (2002) – with Shinji Hosoe and Ayako Saso
Final Fantasy Tactics Advance (2003) – with Ayako Saso, Kaori Ohkoshi, and Nobuo Uematsu
Gradius V (2004)
Stella Deus: The Gate of Eternity (2004) – with Masaharu Iwata
Mushihimesama (2004) – with Basiscape, Shinji Hosoe, Ayako Saso, and Shoichiro Sakamoto
Wizardry Gaiden: Prisoners of the Battles (2005) – with Masaharu Iwata, Mitsuhiro Kaneda, and Kenichi Koyano
Bleach: Heat the Soul 2 (2005) – with Basiscape
Zoids: Full Metal Crash (2005) – with Basiscape
Monster Kingdom: Jewel Summoner (2006) – with several others
Fantasy Earth: Zero (2006) – with Masaharu Iwata, Manabu Namiki, and Kenichi Koyano
Final Fantasy XII (2006) – with Masaharu Iwata and Hayato Matsuo
Digimon Battle Terminal (2006) – with Basiscape
Battle Stadium D.O.N (2006) – with Basiscape
Digimon World Data Squad (2006) – with Basiscape
Bleach: Heat the Soul 4 (2007) – with Basiscape
GrimGrimoire (2007) – with Basiscape
Final Fantasy XII: Revenant Wings (2007) – with Kenichiro Fukui
Final Fantasy Tactics: The War of the Lions (2007) – with Masaharu Iwata
Odin Sphere (2007) – with Basiscape
ASH: Archaic Sealed Heat (2007) – with Masaharu Iwata
Final Fantasy Tactics A2 (2007) – with Ayako Saso, Kaori Ohkoshi, Mitsuhiro Kaneda, and Nobuo Uematsu
Opoona (2007) – with Basiscape
Deltora Quest: The Seven Gems (2007) – with Basiscape
L no Kisetsu 2: Invisible Memories (2008) – with Basiscape
Valkyria Chronicles (2008)
The Wizard of Oz: Beyond the Yellow Brick Road (2008) – with Kimihiro Abe, Masaharu Iwata, and Michiko Naruke
Elminage: Priestess of Darkness and The Ring of Gods (2008) – with Basiscape
Coded Soul: Uketsugareshi Idea (2008) – with Basiscape
Elminage II (2009)
Muramasa: The Demon Blade (2009) – with Basiscape
Tekken 6 (2009) – with several others
Lord of Vermilion II (2009)
Valkyria Chronicles II (2010)
Tactics Ogre: Let Us Cling Together (2010) – remake, with Masaharu Iwata and Hayato Matsuo
Rikishi: Legend of Paper Wrestling (2011)
Valkyria Chronicles III (2011)
The Denpa Men: They Came By Wave (2012) – with Basiscape
The Denpa Men 2: Beyond the Waves (2012) – with Basiscape
Crimson Shroud (2012) – with Basiscape
World Zero (2012)
Dragon's Crown (2013)
The Denpa Men 3: The Rise of Digitoll (2013) – with Basiscape
The Denpa Men Free! (2014) – with Basiscape
Age of Ishtaria (2014) – with Masaharu Iwata
Rage of Bahamut (2014) – 3rd anniversary soundtrack
Terra Battle (2014) – with Nobuo Uematsu, Kenji Ito, Yoko Shimomura, and Yasunori Mitsuda
Battle Champs (2015)
The World End Eclipse (2015)
Chaos Dragon (2015)
Zodiac: Orcanon Odyssey (2015)
Odin Sphere Leifthrasir (2016) – with Basiscape
Tiger Knight (2016)
Valiant Force (2016)
Final Fantasy XII: The Zodiac Age (2017)
Shinnazuki (2018)
Valkyria Chronicles 4 (2018)
Tales of Demons and Gods (2018) – with Basiscape
Project Babel (2019)
13 Sentinels: Aegis Rim (2019) – with Basiscape
Shining Beyond (2020) – with Basiscape
Unsung Story (2020)
Astria Ascending (2021) – with several others
 Little Noah: Scion of Paradise (2022)
 Tactics Ogre: Reborn (2022) – with Basiscape
Valiant Force 2 (2023)
Sword of Convallaria (TBA)
Songs of Silence (TBA)

Other

MCMXCI (1991) – with several others
MYSTERY CASE in HI! SCHOOL! (1992) – with several others
Be filled with feeling (1992) – with several others
Great Wall (1993) – with several others
G.T.R (1993) – with several others
T•O•U•R•S (1994) – with several others
Ten Plants (1998) – with several others
2197 (1999) – with several others
ArtePizza.com (2005) – Home Page Theme
Colors of Life (2005) – with Lia
Legend of Phoenix ~Layla Hamilton Monogatari~ (2005)
Romeo x Juliet (2007)
COLORS (2008)
The Tower of Druaga: The Aegis of Uruk (2008)
The Tower of Druaga: The Sword of Uruk (2009)
Iron Vendetta (2011)
Oto Gift (2011) – with Basiscape
Tekken: Blood Vengeance (2011) – with Basiscape
Red Dragon (2012)
THE LEGEND ARTISTS Otakara Hakken! (2014) – with several others
Chaos Dragon (2015)

See also
Music of the Final Fantasy Tactics series
Music of Final Fantasy XII

References

External links

Official worklist 

1969 births
Anime composers
Japanese composers
Japanese electronica musicians
Japanese film score composers
Japanese male composers
Japanese male film score composers
Japanese music arrangers
Japanese record producers
Living people
Musicians from Kagoshima Prefecture
Square Enix people
Video game composers